Nilachakra Ekamra TV is a regional Odia language Indian cable television station. It was the third fully privately owned only entertainment television channel in Odisha when it emerged in 2009. It has been elevated from Cable Network to a Satellite Channel offering 24 hours entertainment and didactic programmes. The channel broadcasts a variety of shows, such as numerous soap operas, comedy shows, game shows, and shows of general entertainment. The programmes have been exhaustively made to suit multifarious sections of the viewers starting from kids and teenagers to housewives, workers, sports lovers, business persons and other professionals in different domains such as education, politics, agriculture, science and technology, etc.

Programming
Prabhukrupa
Saranagati
Bhagya Bhabisyata
Dekhutha Hasi Gadutha
Dharmatma
Kalijuga
Muthaye Sapan
Sata Kahile Satya Nasha
Galuanka Olua
Bhauja
Good Bye Ten
Narada Ubacha
Rasa Jharitam
Jhumuka Painri
Publicdemand

Channels

See also
List of Odia-language television channels
List of television stations in India

External links
 ekamratv.com

Television channels and stations established in 2009
Odia-language television channels
Television stations in Bhubaneswar
2009 establishments in Orissa